Anne Lise Ryel (born 7 June 1958) is a Norwegian jurist and politician for the Labour Party.

Born in Tromsø, she graduated as cand.jur. from the University of Oslo in 1987.

In 1994 she became the new Norwegian ombudsman for gender equality, taking over for Ingse Stabel. She held this position until 2000. During the first cabinet Stoltenberg, Ryel was appointed State Secretary in the Ministry of Justice. She held the position until the 2001 election, which caused the cabinet to fall. Ryel later became general director of the Norwegian Cancer Association. From 2007 to 2009 she is a board member of the Federation of Norwegian Commercial and Service Enterprises.

She served in the position of deputy representative to the Norwegian Parliament from Oslo during the term 2005–2009.

References

Anne Lise Ryel at forskning.no

1958 births
Living people
Politicians from Tromsø
Deputy members of the Storting
Politicians from Oslo
Labour Party (Norway) politicians
Norwegian state secretaries
Norwegian jurists
University of Oslo alumni
Women members of the Storting
Directors of government agencies of Norway
Ombudsmen in Norway
Norwegian women state secretaries